1991 in Korea may refer to:
1991 in North Korea
1991 in South Korea